The 1959 World Shotgun Championships were held in Cairo, Egypt, the United Arab Republic.

Medal count

Results

References 
 All WCH medallists (ISSF website)

ISSF World Shooting Championships
Shooting
1959 in Egyptian sport
1950s in Cairo
Sports competitions in Cairo
Shooting competitions in Egypt